Oraseminae is a subfamily of chalcid wasps in the family Eucharitidae. There are at least 10 genera in Oraseminae.

Genera
These 12 genera belong to the subfamily Oraseminae:

 Australosema Heraty & Burks, 2017 g
 Cymosema Heraty & Burks, 2017 g
 Hayatosema Heraty & Burks, 2017 g
 Ibitya Heraty & Burks, 2017 g
 Indosema Husain & Agarwal, 1983 c g
 Ivieosema Heraty & Burks, 2017 g
 Leiosema Heraty & Burks, 2017 g
 Matantas Heraty & Burks, 2017 g
 Orasema Cameron, 1884 c g b
 Orasemorpha Boucek, 1988 c g
 Timioderus Waterston, 1916 c g
 Zuparka Heraty & Burks, 2017 g

Data sources: i = ITIS, c = Catalogue of Life, g = GBIF, b = Bugguide.net

References

Further reading

External links

 

Parasitic wasps
Chalcidoidea